The 9th Pan American Games were held in Caracas, Venezuela  from August 14 to August 29, 1983.

Medals

Silver

Men's Discus Throw: Bradley Cooper

Results by event

See also
Bahamas at the 1984 Summer Olympics

Nations at the 1983 Pan American Games
1983
Pan American Games